Fosses is a commune in the Val-d'Oise department in Île-de-France in northern France.

Population

Heraldic

Education
Schools in Fosses:
Preschools (écoles maternelles): Alphonse Daudet, Alexandre Dumas, La Fontaine, and Frédéric Mistral
Elementary schools: Henri Barbusse, Alphonse Daudet, Alexandre Dumas, and Frédéric Mistral
Collège Stendhal (junior high schools)
Lycée Polyvalent Charles Baudelaire (senior high school)

International relations

Fosses is twinned with:
 Serres, Greece
 Bil'in, Palestine
 Kampti, Burkina Faso

See also
Communes of the Val-d'Oise department

References

External links

Official website  

Land use (IAURIF)
Association of Mayors of the Val d'Oise 

Communes of Val-d'Oise